

Hope Valley was the first full-fledged country club community in the suburbs of Durham, Durham County, North Carolina.  It is developed around an 18-hole Donald Ross golf course. Created in 1925-26 just before the stock market crash of 1929, Hope Valley remained a unique rural colony until after World War II. Well outside the city limits Hope Valley was situated between Durham and Chapel Hill, and their university campuses, Duke and UNC Chapel Hill.  It was one of North Carolina's first suburbs designed to be completely serviced by the automobile, well beyond urban transportation routes. It was listed on the National Register of Historic Places in 2009 as the Hope Valley Historic District, a national historic district.

Hope Valley Historic District
The district encompasses 80 contributing buildings, 1 contributing site, and 2 contributing objects in a predominantly upper-class residential section of Durham. They were built between 1927 and 1959 and include notable examples of Colonial Revival and Tudor Revival style architecture. The centerpiece of the district is the country club and golf course.  Located in the district is the separately listed Wiley and Elizabeth Forbus House.

History
Hope Valley's original developers were Jesse Mebane of Greensboro, North Carolina and Walter Sharpe of Burlington, North Carolina (Mebane and Sharpe, Inc.).  Early investors included many local residents and Greensboro's Richardson Family (Richardson - Vicks Pharmaceuticals) who later took control of the development and renaming the corporation Hope Valley, Inc.

In a rare collaboration, Donald Ross, Aymar Embury II, and Robert Cridland came together to create Hope Valley.  Ross designed the 18 hole golf course, Embury designed the French Eclectic style Country Club Clubhouse, and Cridland designed the roadways and landscape.

The Hope Valley Country Club (HVCC) golf course has undergone a multimillion-dollar renovation and restoration, with a major focus on its greens. The Hope Valley Country Club created by a collaboration of the development's original backers and Durham business leaders has been the careful steward of this Donald Ross "Gem" for over 80 years. The first golf professional was Marshall Crichton (1926-1960) and the course has had a member of the Crichton family on staff ever since. In the Spring of 2013 HVCC completed a renovation of its swimming pools and surrounding wet areas. The club also has an active year-round tennis program with seven clay courts and two hard courts.

The neighborhood is experiencing infill as retiring and moving residents sell their side lots, mid-century ranches and investment properties. There have also been some (tragic) examples of "tear down" purchases.  The homes of some of Durham's first and second generation business, education and social leaders including Russell Barringer, Frank Kenan, Herschel Caldwell, Wilburt Davison, and John Moorhead have been razed for new residential construction.

The Hubert Teer House, a Hope Valley landmark from 1932, is well known for the exact miniature model of it that Mr. Teer built on the grounds as a playhouse for his daughter. It underwent a significant and sympathetic restoration by its current resident Mr. Teer's above-mentioned daughter and her husband prior to 2002.

The Hope Valley neighborhood is often referred to as "Old Hope Valley", with a relative absence of newly constructed homes with the vast majority of houses situated on lots that are considerably larger than those in newer, close-by developments (including the adjacent areas of "New Hope Valley", and Marydell, Hope Valley Green, Woodcroft and Hope Valley Farms)--some as much as four acres. Many areas in Hope Valley are heavily wooded and are home to deer, foxes, red-shouldered hawks and barred owls. Hope Valley is convenient to Chapel Hill, Research Triangle Park, Raleigh Durham Airport, Cary and Raleigh via I-40 (3 miles South).

Murder investigation 
In April 2018, real estate developer Bill Bishop was found murdered in his Hope Valley home on Dover Road.

Notable buildings 
 John C. and Binford Carr House
 Wiley and Elizabeth Forbus House

Notable residents and country club members 
 Vernetta Alston, politician and attorney
 Bill Bishop, real estate developer and murder victim
 Victor Dzau, scientist and former head of Duke Medical Center
 Douglas Knight, academic and former head of Duke University
 Mena Webb, journalist and writer

References

 Donald Ross and his Total Gem - John Moorhead - HVCC MGA, 2000
 Preservation Durham Historic Home Tour Book - Farm to Green, Old Hope Valley, an Early Garden Suburb - 2002
 Preservation Durham Historic Home Tour Book - Crown to Club, Hope Valley - 2010
 Various newsletters Hope Valley Neighborhood Association - "Down in the Valley" - hvna.org
 Southern Historical Collection - Wilson Library - UNC Chapel Hill - Smith Richardson Papers
 Durham Collection  - Durham County Public Library - Hope Valley Collection, Hope Valley Garden Club Collection
 Perkins Bostock Library, Duke University - Durham Morning Herald microfilm files, 1925 - 1929
 Historic Preservation Society of Durham - The Durham Historic and Architectural Inventory - 1982 
 Syracuse University Special Collections - Aymar Embury II papers
 Tufts Archives - Pinehurst NC
 Robert D. Cridland - "Practical Landscape Gardening" various printings
 Hope Valley Country Club

External links 
 Hope Valley Neighborhood Association

Neighborhoods in Durham, North Carolina
Sports venues in Durham, North Carolina
Historic districts on the National Register of Historic Places in North Carolina
Colonial Revival architecture in North Carolina
Tudor Revival architecture in North Carolina
Buildings and structures in Durham, North Carolina
National Register of Historic Places in Durham County, North Carolina
1926 establishments in North Carolina
Populated places established in 1926